Bangiaceae is a family of red algae in the order Bangiales. It contains laver, used to make laverbread, and various species in the genus of Pyropia are used to make nori.

Genera
Genera accepted in 2018;
 Aspalatia Ercegovic
 Bangia Lyngbye
 Bangiadulcis W.A.Nelson
 Bangiella Gaillon
 Bangiomorpha N.J.Butterfield 
 Boreophyllum S.C.Lindstrom, N. Kikuchi, M.Miyata, & Neefus
 Clymene W.A.Nelson
 Diadenus Palisot de Beauvois ex O.Kuntze
 Dione W.A.Nelson
 Diploderma Kjellman
 Diplodermodium Kuntze
 Fuscifolium S.C.Lindstrom
 Girardia S.F.Gray
 Lysithea W.A.Nelson
 Minerva W.A.Nelson
 Miuraea N.Kikuchi, S.Arai, G.Yoshida, J.A.Shin, & M.Miyata
 Neothemis A.Vergés & N.Sánchez
 Phyllona J.Hill
 Porphyra C.Agardh
 Porphyrea Solier
 Porphyrella G.M.Smith & Hollenberg
 Pseudobangia K.M.Müller & R.G.Sheath
 Pyropia J.Agardh
 Spermogonia Bonnemaison
 Themis N.Sánchez, A.Vergés, C.Peteiro, J.Sutherland, & J.Brodie
 Wildemania De Toni

References

External links

Bangiophyceae
Red algae families
Taxa described in 1830